Music is My Silence, the first album by Belinda O'Hooley, was released on 13 June 2005 on the Rabble Rouser label, distributed by Cadiz Music. Reviewer David Kidman of Netrhythms.com described it as "a commanding and defiant set of thoroughly contemporary-sounding songs".

Track listing

Personnel
 Belinda O'Hooley – piano, vocals, backing vocals, voiceover on track 6, percussion
 Paul Denny – drums
 Chris Price – bass guitar
 Rachel Unthank – cello
 Janet Coyle – flute and accordion
 Steve Waterman – trumpet
 Kevin Holborough – trombone
 Adrian McNally – percussion, backing vocals
 Nicola Swords – voiceover on track 6

Production
The album was recorded in 2003 by Jerry Barker at Woodman Studios, Elland, West Yorkshire.

References

External links
 Official website: O'Hooley & Tidow

2005 debut albums
Albums produced by Adrian McNally
Belinda O'Hooley albums